Bovista is a genus of fungi commonly known as the true puffballs. It was formerly classified within the now-obsolete order Lycoperdales, which, following a restructuring of fungal taxonomy brought about by molecular phylogeny, has been split; the species of Bovista are now placed in the family Agaricaceae of the order Agaricales. Bovista species have a collectively widespread distribution, and are found largely in temperate regions of the world. Various species have historically been used in homeopathic preparations.

Description
Fruit bodies are oval to spherical to pear-shaped, and typically  in diameter with a white or light-colored thin and fragile exoperidium (outer layer of the peridium). Depending on the species, the exoperidium in a young specimen may be smooth, granular, or finely echinulate. This exoperidium sloughs off at maturity to expose a smooth endoperidium with a single apical pore (ostiole). The fruit bodies may be attached to the ground by fine rhizomorphs that may appear like a small cord. Some species develop a subgleba—a sterile base that is typically not well developed. The fruit bodies of mature specimens can develop surface alterations such as scales, plates, areolae, or verrucae. At the microscopic level, these features are made of hyphae, sphaerocysts (rounded cells), claviform (club-shaped) cells. Bovista sclerocystis is the only species in the genus with mycosclereids (setoid elements) in the peridium.

Spores are brown to purple-brown, roughly spherical or ellipsoid in shape, and 3.5–7 μm in diameter. A short or long pedicel (stalk) may be present. At maturity, the entire fruit body may become detached from the ground, and the spores spread as the puffball is blown around like a tumbleweed.

In Bovista, the capillitium (a network of thread-like cells in which the spores are embedded) is not connected directly to the interior wall of the peridium. Instead, it is made of separate, irregularly branched units that end in tapered points. This type of capillitium, also present in the puffball genera Calbovista and Bovistella, has been called the "Bovista" type by Hanns Kreisel, who published a monograph on Bovista in 1967. Kreisel also defined the "Lycoperdon"-type (a capillitium comprising long, threads with occasional dichotomous or irregular branches), and the "intermediate" type (a transitional form between the Bovista type and Lycoperdon type, featuring threads that may be pored, with several thick main stems connected by multiple branches). All three types of capillitia structure are found in Bovista. "Bovista"-type capillitia are elastic, a feature shared with the gasteroid genera Lycoperdon and Geastrum. The flexibility of the capillitium gives the gleba a cottony texture that persists even after the exoperidium has been sloughed off.

Systematics

The genus was originally described by mycologist Christiaan Hendrik Persoon in 1794. He described the genus as "Cortice exteriore libero evanefcente, pileo acauli demum glaberrimo, vertice irregulariter rupto" ("Exterior cortex vanishes, cap stemless becoming smooth, irregularly breaking the top"). Synonyms include Piesmycus (Rafinesque 1808), Piemycus (Rafinesque 1813), Sackea (Rostkovius 1844), Globaria (Quélet 1873), and Pseudolycoperdon (Velenovský 1947). Bovista plumbea is the type species.

Kreisel, in his 1967 monograph, proposed two subgenera based on the type of capillitium. Subgenus Globaria has species of the Lycoperdon type, while subgenus Bovista is represented by the Bovista-type or intermediate capillitium. Further divisions into sections and series is based on the capillitium type, the absence or presence of pores in the capillitia, and the presence or absence of a subgleba (a sterile base). Phylogenetic analysis has shown that Bovista, as defined by Kreisel, is monophyletic. Also, Bovista may be split into two clades, Bovista and Globaris, that roughly correspond to the subgeneric divisions suggested by Kreisel.

Edibility
Puffballs of the genus Bovista are generally edible when young and white inside, but caution must be taken to prevent confusion with immature, and potentially deadly Amanitas. This is done by cutting fruit bodies longitudinally to ensure that they are white throughout, and do not have internal structures within.

Related genera
Bovistina is a related but separate genus that was created to describe species with the external features of a puffball, but with the glebal characters of a Geaster. Bovistella is another similar genus, it may be distinguished from Bovista by its ample sterile base.

Use in homeopathy
Reference to the genus has appeared in several 19th-century textbooks on homeopathy. Richard Hughes wrote in A Manual of Pharmacodynamics (1870) "Bovista is said to be indicated, and to have proved curative in head affections characterised by a sensation as if the head were enormously increased in size". In Lectures on Clinical Materia Medica (1887), E. A. Farrington claims that Bovista spores restrict blood circulation through the capillaries, and suggests uses associated with menstrual irregularity, or trauma. He also mentions that Bovista produces some symptoms of suffocation, and might be useful in remedying asphyxiation resulting from inhalation of charcoal fumes. Even more ailments have been suggested to be improved with use of Bovista, such as "awkwardness in speech and action", "stuttering or stammering children", "palpitation after a meal", diabetes mellitus, ovarian cysts, and "acne due to cosmetics".

Species
The Dictionary of the Fungi (10th edition, 2008) estimates there are 55 Bovista species worldwide. Index Fungorum lists 92 species that it considers to be valid.

 Bovista acocksii
 reported in South Africa
 Bovista acuminata
 Bovista aenea
 Bovista aestivalis – California
 Bovista africana
 Bovista albosquamosa
 Bovista apedicellata
 Bovista amethystina
 Bovista antarctica
 Bovista arachnoides
 Bovista ardosiaca
 Bovista aspara
 Bovista betpakdalinica
 Bovista bovistoides
 Bovista brunnea
 Bovista cacao
 Bovista californica
 Bovista capensis
 Bovista cisneroi
 Bovista citrina
 Bovista colorata
 Bovista concinna
 Bovista coprophila
 Bovista cretacea
 Bovista cunninghamii
 Bovista dakotensis
 Bovista dealbata
 Bovista dermoxantha
 reported causing fairy rings in Chiba City (Japan)
 Bovista dominicensis
 Bovista dryina
 Bovista dubiosa
 Bovista elegans
 Bovista flaccida
 Bovista flavobrunnea
 Bovista fuegiana
 reported from Tierra del Fuego, Argentina
 Bovista gunnii
 Bovista fulva
 Bovista fusca
 Bovista glacialis
 Bovista glaucocinerea
 Bovista grandipora
 Bovista graveolens
 Bovista grisea
 Bovista gunnii
 Bovista halophila
 Bovista herrerae
 Bovista heterocapilla
 Bovista himalaica
 Bovista hungarica
 Bovista incarnata
 Bovista jonesii
 Bovista kazachstanica
 Bovista kurczumensis
 Bovista kurgaldzhinica
 Bovista lauterbachii
 Bovista leonoviana
 Bovista leucoderma
 Bovista limosa
 Originally collected in Iceland
 Bovista longicauda
 Bovista longispora
 Bovista longissima
 Bovista lycoperdoides
 Bovista macrospora
 Bovista magellanica
 Bovista minor
 Bovista membranacea
 Bovista monticola
 Bovista nigra
 Bovista nigrescens – Brown puffball, black bovist
 Bovista oblongispora
 Bovista ochrotricha
 Bovista paludosa – Fen puffball
 Bovista perpusilla
 Bovista pila – Tumbling puffball
 Bovista plumbea – Paltry Puffball, grey puffball
 Bovista polymorpha
 Bovista promontorii
 Bovista pulyuggeodes
 Bovista pusilla – Dwarf puffball
 Bovista pusilloformis
 found in Finland
 Bovista radicata
 Bovista reunionis
 Bovista ruizii
 Bovista schwarzmanniana
 Bovista sclerocystis
 reported from Mexico
 Bovista sempervirentium
 Bovista septima
 Bovista singeri
 reported from Nor Yungas, Bolivia
 Bovista spinulosa
 Bovista sublaevispora
 reported form Viña del Mar, Chile
 Bovista substerilis
 Bovista sulphurea
 Bovista termitum
 Bovista tomentosa
 Bovista trachyspora
 Bovista umbrina
 Bovista uruguayensis
 Bovista vascelloides
reported from Nepal
 Bovista vassjaginiana
 Bovista verrucosa
 Bovista yasudae
 Bovista zeyheri

See also
List of Agaricaceae genera
List of Agaricales genera

References

External links

 California Fungi
 Trial field key to the LYCOPERDACEAE & GEASTRACEAE in the Pacific Northwest
 The Gasteromycetes of the Eastern United States and Canada, pp. 97—100

Agaricaceae
Edible fungi
Agaricales genera
Puffballs
Taxa named by Christiaan Hendrik Persoon